Admir Kecap (born 25 November 1987) is a Serbian football left winger who plays for FK Rušanj.

Career
Born in Novi Pazar, Kecap passed youth categories of the local club with same name. He started his senior career with lower ranked club Jošanica, where he spent several seasons before he returned in his home club in 2009. Playing for Novi Pazar, Kecap noted more than 150 caps in the Serbian First League and Serbian SuperLiga between 2009 and 2015. In summer 2015, Kecap moved to Sūduva Marijampolė, where he stayed until the end of 2016. After the end of contract with club, Kecap joined Novi Pazar again at the beginning of 2017.

Kecap also played a rival match for the team named "Selekcija novinara" (News writer's selection), which was created from players who mostly appeared in the Serbian SuperLiga, against Serbia national football team, at the Užice City Stadium.

Private life
Kecap received a faculty diploma in 2013, and was nominated for the best sportsman of Novi Pazar in the same year.

References

External links
 Admir Kecap stats at utakmica.rs 
 
 
 

1987 births
Living people
Sportspeople from Novi Pazar
Association football wingers
Serbian footballers
Serbian expatriate footballers
FK Novi Pazar players
FK Sūduva Marijampolė players
FK Metalac Gornji Milanovac players
FK Trayal Kruševac players
Serbian First League players
Serbian SuperLiga players
A Lyga players
Expatriate footballers in Lithuania
Serbian expatriate sportspeople in Lithuania